Rogers Joseph Pierre (July 26, 1913 – July 27, 1996) was an American Negro league pitcher between 1939 and 1946.

A native of New Orleans, Louisiana, Pierre made his Negro leagues debut in 1939 with the Chicago American Giants, and played for the Seattle Steelheads in 1946. He died in New Orleans in 1996 at age 83.

References

External links
 and Seamheads

1913 births
1996 deaths
Chicago American Giants players
Seattle Steelheads players
Baseball pitchers
Baseball players from New Orleans
20th-century African-American sportspeople